Judith Chevalier is the William S. Beinecke Professor of Finance and Economics at Yale University.  She is also a Fellow of the Econometric Society, a member of the American Academy of Arts and Sciences, a former co-editor of the American Economic Review and of the RAND Journal of Economics.  In 1998, she was the first to receive the Elaine Bennett Research Prize.

She graduated from Yale University in 1989 and earned her PhD from Massachusetts Institute of Technology in 1993.  She was an assistant professor of economics at Harvard University for a year before taking a position at the University of Chicago Booth School of Business, where she was awarded tenure in 1997.  In 2001, she returned to Yale as a professor in the Yale School of Management.

Her research focuses on applied microeconomics, particularly empirical industrial organization studies of e-commerce and the financial industry. She has written widely cited papers about online reviews, with one paper on online book reviews receiving more than 3500 citations.  In recent years, she has studied the interaction of consumer reviews and firm behavior, the economics of electronic commerce, and the effects of new technologies on workers, consumers, firms, and regulators. Some of her more recent research focuses on the impact of state regulations in the market for funeral products and services and the taste for leisure as a determinant of occupational choice.

Selected works

References 

American women economists
20th-century American economists
21st-century American economists
Yale School of Management faculty
University of Chicago Booth School of Business faculty
Harvard University faculty
MIT School of Humanities, Arts, and Social Sciences alumni
Yale College alumni
Living people
Fellows of the Econometric Society
Fellows of the American Academy of Arts and Sciences
Year of birth missing (living people)
20th-century American women
21st-century American women